This is a list of franchise records for the Guildford Flames of the Elite Ice Hockey League.

Guildford Flames